Echinargus isola, or Reakirt's blue, is a butterfly of the family Lycaenidae. It is the sole representative of the monotypic genus Echinargus.
It is found in Central America and the extreme southern U.S. Echinargus isola migrates regularly throughout most of the U.S. almost to the Canada–United States border, and very rarely into the southern prairies.

The wingspan is 16–23 mm. Adults are on wing from June to October in the north and year round in south. Its habitats include fields, gardens, open areas, and host plants.

The larvae feed on Fabaceae, particularly mesquites (Prosopis species). Adults feed on flower nectar from spearmint, white sweet clover, and a variety of other herbs.

Subspecies
Echinargus isola isola
Echinargus isola alce (Edwards, 1871) (Colorado)

References

Polyommatini
Butterflies of North America
Butterflies described in 1866
Taxa named by Tryon Reakirt
Butterflies of Central America